Alludugaaru Vachcharu is a 1999 Telugu-language drama film, produced by Sunkara Madhu Murali, Mullapudi Brahmanandam under the M.R.C & Melody Theaters banner and directed by Ravi Raja Pinisetty. It stars Jagapati Babu, Kausalya, Heera Rajagopal  and music composed by M. M. Keeravani. The film is a remake of the Tamil movie Pooveli (1998) which is itself an unofficial remake of A walk in The clouds (1995).

Plot
The film begins with Murali a professional violinist who is an orphan. He falls for a playback singer Shalini and behinds her as white on rice. Howbeit, she loathes & disgraces his love when he states not to vex her anymore. Plus, a day arises when she will fell his love and proceed toward him. Parallelly, Murali gets acquainted with his childhood bestie Mahalakshmi / Maha, and hears about her love Madhu. Once he views Maha walking to a graveyard near Madhu's sepulcher when she moves rearward. Madhu & Maha are turtle doves in the college even Madhu's parents also accept their match. Maha's father Raghava Rao is the arbitrator of their village who is stubborn and persistent. Suddenly, he fixes Maha's alliance and instructs her to right back. So, to abscond, by the notion of Madhu, Maha notifies her family that they have knitted. Additionally, they plan a register a marriage the coming morning. Just before the wedding, tragically, Madhu dies in an accident. 

Presently, Maha says to relieve this pain she is moving abroad after getting the Visa. Abruptly, the Police reach therein and apprehends them on suspicion. Therefore, to be free Murali affirms Maha as his wife. By the time they get home Maha's uncle Shankar Rao is lying ahead, he too misinterprets Murali as their son-in-law and asks them to accompany him. Now, Maha requests Murali to play the role of her husband before her family. Since it is inevitable, Murali goes on to. Maha consists of a conjoined jollity family who gives them warm welcome. Anyhow, Raghava Rao is red as he is still in a state of denial of their nuptial. Besides, Srihari Maha's brother-in-law is debauchery and neglects his wife & children. On that account, Raghava Rao ostracizes him from the house. Murali reforms and joins him back. 

Currently, Murali is surrounded by a bunch of relations that he is craving, lacks his ability for joy, and suffocates. Hence, he opts to receive hatred from the family to avoid being downcast when he leaves. Superfluously, it backfires in turn he acquires their credence and affection. Thus, he hits the road informing Maha which dismays her because she developed a strange warmth with Murali. As it happens, he also thinks the same but forcibly continues. Yet, he is recouped due to a stroke when the loving-kindness flourishes between the twosome. Nevertheless, they are unbeknownst to their respective intentions. Apart from this, Shalini also blossoms a romantic flavor for Murali. 

Meanwhile, Maha’s grandmother senses the dramaturgy when with a trick she sets up their wedlock. Further, she pleads and swears an oath from Murali to espouse Maha. On the day of the merger, Shalini lands & panics spotting Murali as bridegroom when she outbursts, steps aside, and Murali beyond her. Taking it into account, Raghava Rao misconstrues Murali. Alongside, Murali proclaims the true state and his incapability of quitting Maha & her family. Listening to it, Shalini replies to retrieve and he does so. Forthwith, enraged Raghava Rao strikes, mortifies, and kicks out him. Wherefore, Maha is quiet, as gratitude and to succeed in Murali’s love. Next, Shalini gets over and discerns Murali’s endearment for her. Moreover, Maha’s grandmother divulges the actuality when Raghava Rao repents and realizes the eminence of Murali. At last, the entire family rushes and hinders Murali when Maha confirms her love for him. Finally, the movie ends on a happy note with the marriage of Murali & Maha.

Cast

Jagapati Babu as Murali
Kausalya as Mahalakshmi "Maha"
Heera Rajagopal as Shalini
Abbas as Madhu
Nassar as Raghava Rao
Srihari as Srihari
Giri Babu as Shankar Rao
Brahmanandam
M. M. Keeravani as himself
Tanikella Bharani as Madhu's father
M. S. Narayana as Ateesu
AVS as Inspector
Sarika Ramachandra Rao as Madman
Gadiraju Subba Raju as Murthy
Mithai Chitti as Master
Rama Prabha as Mahalakshmi's grandmother
Rajitha as Shankar Rao's wife
Delhi Rajeswari 
Amesha Jalil as Rajyam
Madhurisen as Shalini's friend
Sudeepa Pinky as Mahalakshmi's sister
Oorvasi Patil
Master Tanish
Baby Vaishnavi

Soundtrack

The music is composed by M. M. Keeravani. Lyrics were written by Sirivennela Sitarama Satry. It was released by HMV Audio Company.

References

External links

1999 films
1990s Telugu-language films
Indian romantic drama films
1999 romantic drama films
Films scored by M. M. Keeravani
Telugu remakes of Tamil films
Films directed by Ravi Raja Pinisetty
Films based on Four Steps in the Clouds